Damirchi Darrehsi-ye Olya (also Romanized as Damīrchī Darrehsī-ye ‘Olyā; also known as Damīrchī Darrehsī-ye Bālā) is a village in Pain Barzand Rural District, Anguti District, Germi County, Ardabil Province, Iran. At the 2006 census, its population was 52, in 13 families.

References 

Towns and villages in Germi County